Jeremy Cam Thompson (born October 9, 1985) is a former American football linebacker who played for the Green Bay Packers of the National Football League (NFL). He was drafted by the Packers in the fourth round of the 2008 NFL Draft. He played college football at Wake Forest. He is the younger brother of former New York Giants offensive lineman Orrin Thompson.

Early years
Thompson played high school football at Charlotte Christian School. He was ranked 40th nationally at defensive end by Rivals.com and ranked 19th among North Carolina prospects. He was listed as the country's 37th-best defensive end by TheInsiders.com and also ranked 90th on the "Atlantic Hot 100" by the same publication.

College career
Thompson played college football at Wake Forest. Thompson started 32 of 46 games that he played in at Wake Forest at right defensive end, recording 112 tackles (73 solos), including 8.5 sacks and 20.5 stops for losses. He added one quarterback pressure, two forced fumbles and eight pass deflections and he intercepted two passes for 86 yards in returns and a touchdown.

As a true freshman in 2004 he started three of the 11 games at right defensive end. During the season, he tallied 15 tackles (8 solos) with a sack and three stops for losses. He has an interception and one pass deflected. Thompson started his first 8 games of his 2005 sophomore campaign at right defensive end, but a left knee anterior cruciate ligament tear cost Thompson the final three games of the 2005 season. During those 8 games played he posted 21 tackles (15 solos) with two stops in the backfield and a pass deflection.

During his junior season, Thompson played in 14 games at right defensive end in but only started eight contests due to a shoulder contusion suffered in a late November battle with Maryland. During the season, he recorded 30 tackles (15 solos), a sack and 4.5 stops for losses. He broke up three passes and had a highlight 86-yard interception return for a touchdown vs. Connecticut. As a senior, Thompson led the team with 6.5 sacks and ranked second on the squad with 11 stops in the backfield. He finished sixth on the team with 46 tackles (35 solos). He also caused two fumbles and batted down three passes. He was one of 10 finalists for the National Sportsmanship Award, given to the college player who best personifies the spirit of sportsmanship.

Professional career

Thompson was drafted by the Green Bay Packers in the fourth round (pick 102) of the 2008 NFL Draft. On December 30, 2009, Thompson was placed on injured reserve due to a neck injury. On April 26, 2010, Thompson reported he would be retiring due to an undisclosed medical condition.

Statistics

Personal life
He graduated from medical school at University of North Carolina. He married his college sweetheart Adele (Mitchell) in March 2010 and they moved to Rochester, Minnesota with their 5 children. He completed his orthopedic surgery residency at the Mayo Clinic in 2022. Currently he resides in Louisville, Kentucky where he is completing an Orthopedic Spine Surgical Fellowship

References

External links
Green Bay Packers bio
Wake Forest Demon Deacons bio 

1985 births
Living people
People from Voorhees Township, New Jersey
American football defensive ends
Wake Forest Demon Deacons football players
Green Bay Packers players
Charlotte Christian School alumni
Sportspeople from Camden County, New Jersey
Players of American football from New Jersey